The Kid from Texas is a 1939 Western sports comedy film.

Plot
Margo Thomas, a lady of New York high society, travels to Texas with her brother to buy a new polo pony. When they choose cocky cowboy William Quincy's favorite horse, he asks to accompany them on the trip back East, and when easy-going ranch hand Snifty is chosen instead, William goes along anyway.

William's happy that Margo's rich aunt Minetta takes a shine to him and he develops a romantic attraction to Margo, who resents his arrogance and presence on the Long Island estate so much at first that she asks polo players to pick a fight with him. Trying to learn her favorite sport, William leaves the estate in shame after being thrown from a horse during a polo match.

He still loves the game, so he and Snifty begin a series of Wild West polo matches in the city, "cowboys against Indians," that become popular. William makes the acquaintance of Okay Kinney, a young rider who falls for him. Margo's brother's team ends up playing his, and after impressing her with his skill, William deliberately loses the match, just to please her.

Cast

 Dennis O'Keefe as William "Wild Bill" Malone
 Florence Rice as Margo Thomas
 Buddy Ebsen as Snifty
 Jack Carson as Stanley Brown
 Virginia Dale as "Okay" Kinney
 Jessie Ralph as Aunt Minutia Thomas

Production 
Australian sports star Snowy Baker trained actor Dennis O'Keefe to play polo for the film.

References

External links

The Kid from Texas at TCMDB

1939 films
1930s Western (genre) comedy films
American sports comedy films
American Western (genre) comedy films
American black-and-white films
1930s English-language films
Films directed by S. Sylvan Simon
Metro-Goldwyn-Mayer films
Polo films
1930s sports comedy films
1939 comedy films
Films with screenplays by Florence Ryerson
Films with screenplays by Edgar Allan Woolf
Films set in Texas
Films set in New York (state)
1930s American films